This is a list of notable people who served in the United States Air Force, the Air National Guard, or their antecedents in the Army. See also Graduates of the United States Air Force Academy.

A
 John Agar – Film actor
 Paul W. Airey – First Chief Master Sergeant of the Air Force
 Frank Albertson – Film actor
 Buzz Aldrin – Astronaut (Gemini 12 and Apollo 11 – second man to walk on the Moon)
 Robert Altman – Film director
 William Anders – Astronaut (Apollo 8 – first flight to orbit the Moon)
 Michael P. Anderson – Astronaut (Killed in Columbia Accident)
 Sunny Anderson – Radio and television personality
 Edward Anhalt – Novelist and screenwriter
 Al Anthony – Radio personality
 Richard Arlen – Film actor
 Michael F. Armstrong – Attorney
 Hap Arnold – Aviation pioneer and General of the Air Force
 Xavier Atencio – Film animator
 Gene Autry – Film actor, singer, and Major League baseball team owner

B

 Alonzo Babers – Airline pilot and Olympic athlete
 Jacob “Buddy” Baer – Boxer, Film and TV actor
 Max Baer, Jr – Film actor
 Max Baer, Sr – Boxer and World Heavyweight Champion, Film and TV actor
 Hobey Baker – Amateur hockey player
 Bernt Balchen – Norwegian-born aviation explorer
 Thomas Scott Baldwin – Pioneer balloonist
 Martin Balsam – Film actor
 Sy Bartlett – Film screenwriter and producer, co-author of Twelve O'Clock High
 Warren Beatty – Oscar-winning film actor, director, producer and screenwriter
 Chuck Bednarik – Professional football player
 Art Bell – Talk radio personality
 Brooks Benedict – actor of the silent and sound film eras who served with the American Ambulance Corps and in the U.S. Army Air Service during the First World War
 Lloyd Bentsen – Senator of Texas, 1988 vice presidential nominee, 69th Secretary of the Treasury
 James Best – Television and film actor
 Edward Binns – Television and film actor
 John Birch – East China missionary
 Barry Bishop – Member of the first American team to summit Mount Everest
 Charles F. Blair, Jr. – General officer,  and husband of actress Maureen O'Hara
 Esther Blake – First female member of the United States Air Force
 William Peter Blatty – Oscar-winning screenwriter, film producer, director and author known for his 1971 novel The Exorcist and for writing and producing the highly successful 1973 film adaptation
 John Boccieri – Member of Congress of Ohio.
 Richard Bong – American Ace of Aces
 Frank Borman – Astronaut (Gemini 7 and Apollo 8 – first flight to orbit the Moon)
 Robert Sidney Bowen – Newspaper journalist, magazine editor and author of the Dave Dawson War Adventure Series and the Red Randall Series. Served as a fighter pilot in both the Royal Air Force (RAF) and the United States Army Air Service, and as an ambulance driver with the American Field Service (AFS) during World War I.
 William Bowers – Screenwriter
 Boxcar Willie – Country music entertainer
 Lewis H. Brereton – Aviation pioneer and only active duty member of USAF and all of its forebearers
 Charles Bronson – Film actor
 Clarence Brown – Six-time Oscar-nominated film director who served as a fighter pilot and flight instructor in the United States Army Air Service during World War I
 Dale Brown – Author
 Roscoe C. Brown, Jr. – Tuskegee Airman, educator, and TV personality
 John Bunch – Jazz pianist
 William Bundy – CIA analyst and foreign affairs advisor
 George W. Bush – 43rd President of the United States
 Craig D. Button – Victim of mysterious flight and crash
 Red Buttons – Film actor

C

 Dann Cahn – Film editor
 Frank Capra – Film director
 George Carlin – Actor and comedian
 Johnny Cash – Country music singer
 Clint Castleberry – College football player
 James Lea Cate – Historian
 Clarence Chamberlin – Barnstormer and aviation pioneer
 Harry Chapin – Singer/songwriter
 Hollis B. Chenery – Economist
 John Ciardi – Poet
 Beryl Clark – Professional football player
 Hal Clement – Author
 Larry Clinton – Band leader
 William Close – Surgeon and physician, father of actress Glenn Close
 Lee J. Cobb – Film actor
 Jacqueline Cochran – Aviator; co-founder and director of the Women Airforce Service Pilots
 Red Cochran – Professional football player, coach, and scout
 Charles J. Colgan – Virginia politician and founder of Colgan Air.
 Eileen Collins – Astronaut (STS-84, STS-93, STS-114)
 Michael Collins – Astronaut (Gemini 10 & Apollo 11)
 Ramón Colón-López – First Hispanic recipient of the Air Force Combat Action Medal
 Mike Connors – Film and TV actor best known for playing private detective Joe Mannix
 Jackie Coogan – Film and television actor
 Gordon Cooper – Mercury astronaut (Mercury 9 & Gemini 5)
 Merian C. Cooper – Adventurer, filmmaker and film producer
 Joseph Cotten – Film actor
 James E. Counsilman – Collegiate swimming coach
 Clyde Cowan – Physicist and discoverer of the neutrino
 James Gould Cozzens – Pulitzer Prize-winning novelist
 Adrian Cronauer – Lawyer, media expert and inspiration for the film Good Morning, Vietnam
 Robert Cummings – Emmy Award-winning film and television actor

D
 James Daly – Emmy Award-winning actor (Planet of the Apes)
 Tom Daschle – Senator of South Dakota
 Benjamin O. Davis, Jr. – First African-American USAF general officer
 Bud Day – Medal of Honor recipient and prisoner of war in Vietnam
 Jimmy Dean – Country music singer, television host, actor, businessman and creator of the Jimmy Dean sausage brand
 James Dickey – Poet, author of the 1970 novel Deliverance and screenwriter of the 1972 film adaptation
 Brian Donlevy – Film actor
 Jimmy Doolittle – Test pilot and aeronautical engineer
 Bob Dornan – Member of Congress from California and talk radio personality
 Charles Duke – Astronaut (Apollo 16)

E
 Robert Ellenstein – Film and television actor
 Sam Elliott – Oscar-nominated film actor
 Jules Engel – Filmmaker and animator
 Joe Engle – Astronaut, X-15 and space shuttle pilot
 Bill Erwin – Character actor known for his 1993 Emmy-nominated performance on Seinfeld, portraying the embittered, irascible retiree Sid Fields in the episode "The Old Man"

F
 Fred D. Fagg Jr. – 2nd Director of Air Commerce and 6th president of the University of Southern California
 Norman Fell – Film and television actor
 Bryce Fisher – Professional football player
 Kelly Flinn – First female B-52 pilot
 Tennessee Ernie Ford – Television comedian and recording artist
 Nathan Bedford Forrest III – Great-grandson of Confederate general Nathan Bedford Forrest
 Joe Foss – U.S. Marine Corps flying ace and 20th Governor of South Dakota
 John Frankenheimer – Film director
 Arthur Franz – Film actor
 Morgan Freeman – Film actor
 Theodore Freeman – Astronaut (first fatality)

G

 Clark Gable – Film actor
 Ernest K. Gann – Novelist
 Daniel Garber – Artist
 William T. Gardiner – 55th Governor of Maine
 Robert Gates – 22d United States Secretary of Defense
 Marvin Gaye – Singer and songwriter
 Michael V. Gazzo – Broadway playwright and film actor best known for playing Frank Pentangeli in The Godfather: Part II (1974)
 Elmer Gedeon –  Three-sport college athlete and professional baseball player
 Leigh Gerdine – Musician, civic leader, Webster University president
 Henry Gibson – Film actor, singer and songwriter
 George Gobel – Television comedian
 Arthur Godfrey – Television personality
 Barry Goldwater – Senator of Arizona and 1964 Republican presidential nominee
 Alberto Gonzales – 80th United States Attorney General
 Dick Grace – Film stunt flyer
 Lindsey Graham – Senator of South Carolina
 Susan Grant – Novelist
 Peter Graves – Film and television actor
 Hank Greenberg – Major League baseball player
 Gus Grissom – Mercury, Gemini, and Apollo Astronaut

H

 Larry Hagman – Film and television actor, director and producer
 William Wister Haines – Novelist, screenwriter and playwright
 Fred Haise – Naval aviator, Air Force pilot, test pilot and NASA astronaut (Apollo 13 and Space Shuttle Enterprise). Of the 24 men to have ever flown to the moon, Haise is also the only Marine.
 Arch Hall Sr. – Film screenwriter, actor and filmmaker
 James Norman Hall – American writer best known for The Bounty Trilogy who holds the distinction of serving in the militaries of three Western allies during World War I; Great Britain as an infantryman, and then France and the United States as an aviator
 Iceal Hambleton – Missile expert, subject of "Bat 21" rescue
 Arthur B. Hancock, Jr. – Thoroughbred racehorse breeder
 Howard Hawks – Academy Award-nominated filmmaker who served as an aviator in the United States Army Air Service during World War I
 Michael Hayden – 19th CIA Director
 Van Heflin – Film actor
 H. John Heinz III – Senator from Pennsylvania
 Joseph Heller – Novelist
 Sherman Hemsley – Actor and musician
 Skitch Henderson – Band leader
 Chad Hennings – Professional football player
 Jim Hensley – Beer executive and father-in-law to John McCain
 Don Herbert – Television personality as "Mr. Wizard"
 Charlton Heston – Film actor
 John Hillerman – Film actor
 Ben Hogan – Professional golfer
 William Holden – Film actor
 Tim Holt – Film actor
 LeRoy Homer Jr. – Airline pilot, co-pilot of United Airlines Flight 93
 John Hope – Television meteorologist
 Rance Howard – Film and TV actor, also father of actor and filmmaker Ron Howard and actor Clint Howard, and grandfather of actresses Bryce Dallas Howard and Paige Howard
 David Huddleston – Emmy Award-nominated film and television actor
 E. Howard Hunt – Intelligence officer and author known for his involvement in the Watergate scandal, also served in the U.S. Navy and the Office of Strategic Services
 Rick Husband – NASA astronaut (killed in the Columbia accident)
 Mac Hyman – Novelist

J
 James Jabara – First American jet ace
 Bernard James – NBA player for the Dallas Mavericks
 Randall Jarrell – Poet
 Rick Jason – Film and television actor
 Russell Johnson – Film and television actor
 Sam Johnson – Member of Congress of Texas
 Bobby Jones – Amateur golf champion
 David M. Jones – Doolittle Raider and POW of Stalag Luft III.

K
 Todd Karns – Film actor who played George Bailey's younger brother, Harry, in the 1946 film It's a Wonderful Life
 Nicholas Katzenbach – 65th United States Attorney General
 William Keighley – Film director and actor who supervised the First Motion Picture Unit of the United States Army Air Forces during World War II
 DeForest Kelley – Film and television actor
 Arthur Kennedy – Film actor
 Ron Kenoly – Christian music worship leader
 Irvin Kershner – Film director
 Algene and Frederick Key – Brothers and aviation pioneers
 Iven Kincheloe – Air Force test pilot
 Micki King – Olympic diving gold-medalist and athletic coach
 Wally Kinnan – Pioneering meteorologist
 Norman Krasna – Screenwriter

L
 
 Alan Ladd – Film actor
 Fiorello H. La Guardia – Mayor of New York City
 Frank Purdy Lahm – First military aviator
 Tom Landry – Dallas Cowboys football coach
 Beirne Lay, Jr. – Screenwriter, co-author of Twelve O'Clock High
 Norman Lear – Television and motion picture producer, director and screenwriter
 Curtis LeMay – USAF Chief of Staff and 1968 vice presidential candidate
 John Levitow – Enlisted recipient of the Medal of Honor
 Jules V. Levy – Film and television producer and screenwriter
 Buddy Lewis – Major League baseball player
 Charles Lindbergh – Legendary aviator
 Roger Locher – USAF pilot whose rescue was the deepest inside North Vietnam during the entire Vietnam War
 Donald S. Lopez, Sr. – Ace with the Flying Tigers
 Robert Moffat Losey – Meteorologist;  considered to be the first American military casualty in World War II
 Nancy Harkness Love – Aviator and co-founder of the Women Airforce Service Pilots
 Frank Luke Jr. – Medal of Honor recipient during World War I

M

 John E. Mack – Psychiatrist
 Gavin MacLeod – Film and television actor
 Gordon MacRae – Broadway and Film actor
 John Lee Mahin – Screenwriter and film producer
 Nicole Malachowski – First woman pilot with United States Air Force Thunderbirds
 Karl Malden – Film actor
 Herman J. Mankiewicz – Oscar-winning screenwriter of Citizen Kane who also served in the U.S. Marine Corps
 Delbert Mann – Television and film director
 Paul Mantz – Film stunt pilot
 Dean Paul Martin – Singer and actor
 Tony Martin – Entertainer
 Vernon Martin – Professional football player
 Jerry Mathers – Television actor
 Walter Matthau – Film actor
 MC Tee – Musician
 T. Allen McArtor – Business executive and FAA Administrator
 Kevin McCarthy – Film actor
 Joseph C. McConnell – Leading U.S. ace of the Korean War
 George McGovern – Senator of South Dakota, 1972 presidential nominee
 Robert McNamara and the Whiz Kids – Ford Motor Company executives
 James Meredith – Civil Rights figure; first African-American to attend the University of Mississippi
 Gary Merrill – Film actor

 Ray Milland – Film actor
 Glenn Miller – Musician and band leader
 Walter M. Miller, Jr. – Science fiction author
 John Purroy Mitchel – 95th Mayor of New York City
 Billy Mitchell – Grandfather of the U.S. Air Force.
 Cameron Mitchell – Film actor
 Nicole Mitchell – TV meteorologist
 Dana Mohler-Faria – President, Bridgewater State College
 George Montgomery – Film and television actor
 Clayton Moore – Television actor
 Dodge Morgan – Single-handed sailor and entrepreneur
 Charles Munger – Billionaire investor
 Richard Murphy – Film screenwriter

N
 Jack Narz – TV game show host
 Willie Nelson – Singer and songwriter
 Mike Nesmith – Guitarist, member of "The Monkees," and heir to the Liquid Paper fortune
 Jack Nicholson – Oscar-winning film actor, director, producer and screenwriter
 Cody Nickson – American television personality, winner of The Amazing Race 30, contestant of Big Brother 19
 Charles Nordhoff – American writer best known for The Bounty Trilogy who served in the Ambulance Corps during World War I, as well as a military aviator in both the French Lafayette Flying Corps and the United States Army Air Service.
 Chuck Norris – B-movie actor

O
 Edmond O'Brien – Film actor
 Jarvis Offutt – U.S. Army Air Service aviator and namesake of Offutt Air Force Base.
 Robin Olds – Two-war triple flying ace
 George Olesen – Cartoonist
 Patrick O'Neal – Film actor
 Robert Osborne – Actor, film historian and author best known as the primary host of the cable channel Turner Classic Movies (TCM) for more than 20 years

P

 Jack Palance – Film actor
 Ron Paul – Member of Congress; 1988, 2008 & 2012 Presidential candidate
 John Payne – Film actor
 Stacy Pearsall – Combat photographer, two-time winner of the NPPA Military Photographer of the Year award
 Leo Penn – Film director
 Leonard Pennario – Concert pianist and composer
 Oscar Francis Perdomo – "Ace in a Day"
 Sonny Perdue – 81st Governor of Georgia.
 H. Ross Perot, Jr. – Member of the Forbes 400 and son of Ross Perot
 Rick Perry – 47th Governor of Texas
 House Peters Jr. – Actor
 Paul Picerni – Actor
 William H. Pitsenbarger – Enlisted recipient of the Medal of Honor
 Robert M. Polich, Sr. – Recipient of Distinguished Flying Cross and POW of Stalag Luft III
 Gregg Popovich – Head Coach of the NBA professional basketball team San Antonio Spurs
 Wiley Post – Famed American aviator during the interwar period and the first pilot to fly solo around the world. Also known for his work in high-altitude flying, Post helped develop one of the first pressure suits and discovered the jet stream.
 Tom Poston – Television comedian
 H.C. Potter – Film director and producer
 Jody Powell – White House Press Secretary
 Francis Gary Powers – CIA U-2 spy plane pilot 
 Robert Preston – Film and Broadway actor
 Robert Prosky – Film actor
 Mario Puzo – Author of The Godfather (1969) and screenwriter of the 1972 film adaptation

Q
 Elwood R. "Pete" Quesada – Aviation pioneer
 Robin Quivers – Co-host of the Howard Stern Show

R
 Dennis Rader – BTK Serial Killer
 John Randolph – Broadway and film actor
 Gene Raymond – Film actor
 Ronald Reagan – 40th President of the United States
 Chuck Reed – Mayor of San Jose, California and his daughter, Kim Campbell, a decorated Iraq War pilot
 George Reeves – Television and film actor
 William Rehnquist – 16th Chief Justice of the United States
 Carl Reiner – Film actor, comedian, director and screenwriter
 Eddie Rickenbacker – Leading American World War I flying ace
 Roy Riegels – All-American football player
 Robinson Risner – Decorated USAF General and Vietnam POW. 
 R. Stephen Ritchie – USAF Ace in the Vietnam War
 Martin Ritt – Film director
 Gene Roddenberry – Television producer
 Marion Rodgers – Communications Specialist, Former Tuskegee Airman
 Elliott Roosevelt – Son of Franklin D. Roosevelt
 Quentin Roosevelt – Son of Theodore Roosevelt, killed in WWI
 Leonard Rosenman – Film composer
 Bob Ross – Painter
 Chelcie Ross – Film actor
 Dan Rowan – Comedian and television actor
 Kurt Russell – Film actor
 Dick Rutan – Aviation record-holder and aircraft designer

S

 Sabu – Film actor
 James Salter – Novelist
 Mark Sanford – 115th Governor of South Carolina
 Roy Scheider – Oscar-nominated actor
 Bob Schieffer – Television journalist
 Tex Schramm – President and general manager of the Dallas Cowboys
 Dick Scobee – Astronaut, killed in Space Shuttle Challenger Disaster
 David Scott – Astronaut (Gemini 8, Apollo 9, and Apollo 15)
 Donald E. Scott – All-American college football quarterback
 Dr. Seuss – Famed American children's author, political cartoonist, illustrator, poet, animator and filmmaker
 Lance Sijan – Medal of Honor recipient
 Sinbad – Actor and comedian
 Tom Skerritt – Film actor
 Deke Slayton – Mercury and Apollo-Soyuz Test Project astronaut
 Jack Smight – Theater, film and television director
 Tubby Smith – NCAA Men's Basketball Coach
 Carl Spaatz – Pioneer airman, first Chief of Staff of the Air Force
 Aaron Spelling – Film and television producer
 Mickey Spillane – Crime novelist
 G.D. Spradlin – Film actor known for The Godfather: Part II (1974)
 Thomas P. Stafford – aviator and astronaut (Gemini 6A, Gemini 9A, Apollo 10)
 Bill Stealey – Business CEO and co-founder of MicroProse
 David Steeves – Pilot who crashed in the Sierra Nevada and endured a nearly two month survival ordeal.
 George Steinbrenner – Team owner of the New York Yankees
 Robert Sterling – Film actor
 Craig Stevens – Television actor
 Ted Stevens – Senator of Alaska
 James Stewart – Film actor
 Bert Stiles – Author
 Ralph Story – Television personality
 Dale E. Stovall – USAF General, decorated Vietnam War search and rescue pilot
 John Sturges – Film director
 Chesley Sullenberger – Airline pilot, hero of Miracle on the Hudson
 Bruce Sundlun – 71st governor of Rhode Island
 Charles Sweeney – Pilot who flew the Fat Man bomb to Nagasaki.
 Jack Swigert – Astronaut and congressman-elect

T
 Don Taylor – Actor and filmmaker known for directing Tom Sawyer (1973) and Echoes of a Summer (1976) starring Jodie Foster. Also directed Damien: Omen II (1978).
 Fred Taylor – College basketball coach
 Kenneth M. Taylor – World War II ace at the Attack on Pearl Harbor
 Hunter S. Thompson – Writer
 Stephen W. Thompson – First U.S. aviator to shoot down an enemy aircraft.
 Bobby Thomson – Major League baseball player
 Leo K. Thorsness – Medal of Honor recipient and Vietnam POW.  
 Harrison R. Thyng – Two-war ace and Senate candidate
 Paul Tibbets – Commander of the Enola Gay
 Mel Tillis – Country Music Singer
 Tuskegee Airmen – First African-American military pilots

U
 Stewart Udall – 37th United States Secretary of the Interior

V
 Dick Van Dyke – Film and TV actor, comedian, writer, singer and dancer
 Jerry Van Dyke – Film and TV actor, musician and comedian
 Melvin Van Peebles – Filmmaker, actor, playwright, novelist and composer best known for Sweet Sweetback's Baadasssss Song, regarded as one of the earliest and most successful films in the blaxploitation genre

W

 Joseph A. Walker – X-15 test pilot
 Kenneth N. Walker – Medal of Honor recipient, airpower visionary
 George Wallace – 45th Governor of Alabama and presidential candidate
 Fred Ward – Actor and producer
 Jack L. Warner – Hollywood film executive 
 Jack Webb – Film and television actor, director, and producer
 George Welch – World War II flying ace, decorated for heroism at the Attack on Pearl Harbor
 William A. Wellman – Oscar-winning film director who, during World War I, served as a fighter pilot in the French Foreign Legion, as a driver in the Norton-Harjes Ambulance Corps on the Western Front, and as a flight instructor in the United States Army Air Service. He was also the first American to join Escadrille N.87 in the Lafayette Flying Corps of the French Air Force during the war. As a fighter pilot, he is credited with three confirmed kills and five probables.
 David Westheimer – Novelist
 Ed White – Astronaut (Gemini 4, first American to walk in space)
 Frank D. White – 41st Governor of Arkansas
 Cornelius Vanderbilt Whitney – Businessman
 John Hay Whitney – Newspaper publisher and Ambassador to Great Britain
 Thornton Wilder – Novelist and playwright
 John Williams – Oscar-winning film composer
 Flip Wilson – Comedian
 Heather Wilson – Member of Congress of New Mexico
 Reality Winner – Whistleblower
 Harris Wofford – Senator of Pennsylvania
 Morgan Woodward – Film and television actor
 Alfred Worden – Astronaut (Apollo 15)
 James C. "Jim" Wright, Jr. – U.S. Representative from Texas and 56th Speaker of the House
 William Wyler – Film director

Y
 Chuck Yeager – Air Force test pilot
 Coleman Young – Mayor of Detroit (1974–1994)

Z
 Louis Zamperini – Olympic distance runner
 Darryl F. Zanuck – Film producer and executive

References

 
Airmen
Airmen
Airmen